Amah al-Wahid  (died 988) was an Abbasid mufti and Islamic jurist.

Life

She lived in Baghdad. She became known and respected as a noted jurist of the Shafiʽi school. She was a well known teacher and scholar of the Koran and was allowed to make juridical verdicts (fatwas). Her position was very unusual for a woman, but it was not unknown: she was one of two women known in that position in Baghdad, the other one being Umm Isa bint Ibrahim.

References

988 deaths
10th-century women from the Abbasid Caliphate
Muftis
Scholars from the Abbasid Caliphate